Smoke Hollow is an American rock band formed in 2015.  In 2017, the ensemble released their debut studio album entitled Salvation.

History
In July 2015, a rock band was started by bass guitarist John Exall, formerly of Texas Hippie Coalition, lead guitarist Diego "Ashes" Ibarra from Static-X, vocalist Jason "Dewey" Bragg from Kill Devil Hill, and drummer Ralf Mueggler from Crowned by Fire.

Soon after the band was started, Jason Williams of American heavy metal band Delphian replaced Ibarra.

In August 2015, the band began an Indiegogo crowdfunding campaign to assist with the recording of their debut album.

In June 2017, they published an audio recording for "Edge of Tomorrow", followed by an Independence Day release of "Nowhere to Run" near the beginning of the month following.

On July 28, 2017, their debut studio album,  Salvation, was released.

In December 2018, the band announced that they were creating a music video for "Salvation", the title track for their debut album.

Personnel

Current 
 Jason "Dewey" Bragg – vocals (2015–present)
 Jason Williams – lead guitar (2015–present)
 John Exall – bass guitar (2015–present)
 Ralf Mueggler – drums (2015–present)

Former 
 Diego "Ashes" Ibarra – lead guitar (2015)

Discography 
 Salvation  (2017)

References 

American rock music groups
Musical groups established in 2015
2015 establishments in the United States